Mucilaginibacter jinjuensis is a Gram-negative and rod-shaped bacterium from the genus of Mucilaginibacter which has been isolated from rotten wood in Jinju in Korea. Mucilaginibacter jinjuensis has the ability to degrade xylan.

References

External links
Type strain of Mucilaginibacter jinjuensis at BacDive -  the Bacterial Diversity Metadatabase

Sphingobacteriia
Bacteria described in 2013